Robert Simson (14 October 1687 – 1 October 1768) was a Scottish mathematician and professor of mathematics at the University of Glasgow. The Simson line is named after him.

Life
The eldest son of John Simson of Kirktonhall, West Kilbride in Ayrshire, Robert Simson was intended for the Church, but the bent of his mind was towards mathematics.  He was educated at the University of Glasgow and graduated M.A.

When the prospect opened of his succeeding to the mathematical chair at the University of Glasgow, Simson proceeded to London for further study.  After a year in London, he returned to Glasgow and, in 1711, was appointed by the university to the professorship of mathematics, an office which he retained until 1761.

He was succeeded by his pupil Rev Prof James Williamson FRSE (1725-1795).

Works

Simson's contributions to mathematical knowledge took the form of critical editions and commentaries on the works of the ancient geometers.  The first of his published writings is a paper in the Philosophical Transactions (1723, vol. xl. p. 330) on Euclid's Porisms.

Then followed Sectionum conicarum libri V. (Edinburgh, 1735), a second edition of which, with additions, appeared in 1750.  The first three books of this treatise were translated into English and, several times, printed as The Elements of the Conic Sections.  In 1749, was published Apollonii Pergaei locorum planorum libri II., a restoration of Apollonius's lost treatise, founded on the lemmas given in the seventh book of Pappus's Mathematical Collection.

In 1756, appeared, both in Latin and in English, the first edition of his Euclid's Elements.  This work, which contained only the first six and the eleventh and twelfth books, and to which, in its English version, he added the Data in 1762, was for long the standard text of Euclid in England.

After Simson's death, restorations of Apollonius's treatise De section determinata and of Euclid's treatise De Porismatibus were printed for private circulation in 1776, at the expense of Earl Stanhope, in a volume with the title Roberti Simson opera quaedam reliqua.  The volume contains also dissertations on Logarithms and on the Limits of Quantities and Ratios, and a few problems illustrating the ancient geometrical analysis.

Notes

References

Further reading 
 William Trail (1812) 
 Charles Hutton (1815) Mathematical and Philosophical Dictionary, volume II, p. 395-398

External links

 Robert Simson, The Elements of Euclid... Errors Corrected... also The Book of Euclid's Data... Corrected 12th ed. (1804)
 Robert Simson's biography at MacTutor archive.
 Simson's line from Cut-the-Knot
 A Scottish sundial erected by Robert Simson at Kirktonhall, West Kilbride.
 The Memorial to Robert Simson in West Kilbride

1687 births
1768 deaths
People from North Ayrshire
Scottish mathematicians
Alumni of the University of Glasgow
Academics of the University of Glasgow
18th-century Scottish mathematicians
18th-century Scottish people
Euclid